Dagfinn Flem (28 July 1906 – 28 May 1976) was a Norwegian politician, newspaper editor, non-fiction writer and translator. He was born in Borgund, a son of Ivar Flem and Nikoline Landmark, and a brother of Magne Flem. He edited the newspaper Sunnmørsposten from 1946, along with his brother. He was mayor of Ålesund for the Liberal Party from 1958 to 1965.

He was decorated Knight, First Class of the Order of St. Olav in 1966.

References

1906 births
1976 deaths
Politicians from Ålesund
Norwegian newspaper editors
Liberal Party (Norway) politicians
Mayors of places in Møre og Romsdal
Prisoners and detainees of Germany
Norwegian prisoners and detainees
20th-century Norwegian writers